Johannes Galliculus (Alectorius, Hähnel, Hennel; c. 1490 in Dresden – c. 1550 in Leipzig) was a German music theorist and composer.

He was active ca. 1520 in Leipzig. He was the cantor of the Thomanerchor from 1520 to 1525.

Works 
Editions: Johannes Galliculus: Gesamtausgabe der Werke, ed. A.A. Moorefield, Gesamtausgaben, viii (Brooklyn, NY, 1975–)

Passio Domino nostri Jesu Christi, 4vv, 1538
Mass Christ ist erstanden 4vv, 1539
Aliud officium Paschale, 4vv, 1539
Proprium mass for Christmas, 4vv, 1545
Magnificat quarti toni, 4vv, 
Magnificat quinti toni, 4vv
Magnificat septimi toni, 4vv
Motets, 4vv: 
Apparuit benignitas, 4vv
Ave vivens, hostie
Cavete a scribis
Christus resurgens 
Duo homines ascenderunt
Immunem semper
In cathedra Moysi
In natali
Non ex operibus
Venite post me
Psalm. Quare fremuerunt gentes, 4vv

Doubtful works 
Enlive psallant; 
Joseph, lieber Joseph, mein

Theorical works 
Isagoge de compositione cantus

Sources 
 Victor H. Mattfeld article in: New Grove Dictionary of Music.
 Heinz von Loesch article in: Die Musik in Geschichte und Gegenwart.
 Online article on www.bach-cantatas.com
 A.A. Moorefield: An Introduction to Johannes Galliculus (Brooklyn, 1969)

External links
 
 

1490s births
1550s deaths
German music theorists
Thomaskantors